The Malay Wikipedia (Jawi alphabet: ويکيڤيديا بهاس ملايو, abbreviation: mswiki) is the Malay edition of Wikipedia. It uses the Malay alphabet only and not the Jawi alphabet. This edition was started on 26 October 2002. The system was activated by Wikipedia administrator Brion Vibber.

Despite the similarities between Malay and Indonesian, the Malay Wikipedia and Indonesian Wikipedia were started separately by two different user groups. The Indonesian Wikipedia was started about six months after the Malay Wikipedia was. As of 2009, the Indonesian Wikipedia had three times the number of active editors and articles the Malay Wikipedia had. In 2009 Andrew Lih wrote "Because these groups are drawn on national boundaries, merging is not likely to happen soon."

Starting 27 July 2016, file upload at the Malay Wikipedia (along with Czech, Spanish, Basque, Gujarati, Portuguese, Simple English, Tagalog and Swedish Wikipedia) is no longer permitted, and users are instead redirected to Wikimedia Commons due to copyright infringement issues. However, file upload at the English, Indonesian and other Wikipedias remains operable.

Malay Wikipedia is having a steady increase in the number of contributors in the late 2010s and early 2020s.

In June 2020, it was the third most visited language Wikipedia in Malaysia with 11 million page views. It ranked below the English Wikipedia (59 million page views in Malaysia) and the Chinese Wikipedia (14 million page views in Malaysia) but above the Indonesian Wikipedia (only 1 million page views in Malaysia).

Milestones
 200,000 - March 21, 2013 - Belforte Monferrato
 190,000 - February 25, 2013 - Galeri Petronas
 178,000 - February 6, 2013 - Doubravice (Daerah České Budějovice)
 125,000 - November 15, 2011 - Morbecque
 120,000 - June 9, 2011 - La Biolle
 115,000 - March 22, 2011 - Raj British
 110,000 - February 23, 2011 - Oëlleville
 105,000 - February 2, 2011 - Bassy
 100,000 - January 9, 2011 - Pressigny-les-Pins

Gallery

References
 Lih, Andrew. The Wikipedia Revolution: How a Bunch of Nobodies Created the World's Greatest Encyclopedia. Hyperion, New York. 2009. 1st ed.   (paper).

Notes

Footnotes

External links

  Mobile version of Malay Wikipedia
  History of Malay Wikipedia

Wikipedias by language
Internet properties established in 2002
Malay-language websites
Malaysian encyclopedias